Aird of Kinloch (Gaelic:An Àird) is a rocky outcrop between Loch Scridain and Loch Beg on the Isle of Mull, Argyll and Bute, Scotland.

References

Rock formations of Scotland
Landforms of the Isle of Mull